"Don't Rush (Take Love Slowly)" is a song recorded by K-Ci & JoJo. The song is the fourth and final single from their debut album, Love Always.

Charts

References 

1997 songs
1998 singles
K-Ci & JoJo songs
MCA Records singles
Songs written by K-Ci